Salah Larbès (born 16 September 1952) is a former Algerian international footballer. He played as a midfielder. He represented Algeria at the 1980 Summer Olympics and the 1982 FIFA World Cup.

References

1952 births
Living people
Algerian footballers
Algeria international footballers
1982 FIFA World Cup players
Olympic footballers of Algeria
Footballers at the 1980 Summer Olympics
JS Kabylie players
1980 African Cup of Nations players
Association football midfielders
21st-century Algerian people